Marcel Grant (born 19 July 1961) is a British independent filmmaker based in London, who has written and directed four feature films, Open My Eyes (2016) Coffee Sex You (2014), Just Inès (2010), and What's Your Name 41? (2005).  Grant is the founder of MAMA Film Worx and the WSFF film festival and brand. He is currently filming a one hour documentary The Late Great ‘78 about his personal experience as a seventeen year old in 1978, featuring Grace Jones and Amanda Lear, due for release in early 2022.

Career 

In the late 1970s Grant was an influential figure on the London and New York club scene, where he worked as an actor and singer. In the early 1980s Grant became a part of the New Romantic movement in London, and in 1984, at the age of 23, was named “London's youngest club entrepreneur” by Time Out magazine for establishing the new concept of ‘One Nighters’ at Legends in Mayfair.

By 1986 Grant had moved into property and project development.  In 1993 Grant started working with Thompson Holdings overseeing several of the group's main interests, such as Windsor Racecourse, Queens Park Rangers F.C. premier league football club and the Portuguese luxury resort Quinta Do Lago. Grant and Thompson then co-founded the film production company Pagoda (1998), which in 2000 saw its first commercial success with the film Gangster No. 1 starring Paul Bettany and Malcolm McDowell.

Grant left Thompson Holdings in 2004, to become an independent filmmaker and to establish the independent film production company Shipwreck Film, where he shot four short films, as well as his first feature What's Your Name 41? (2005) starring Con O'Neill and Ann Mitchell.  The film was shown at several international film festivals, including Raindance Film Festival, the Berlin International Directors Lounge and the California Independent Film Festival.

Grant subsequently wrote, directed and produced three further feature films:  Just Inès (2010); Coffee Sex You (2014); and Open My Eyes (2016).  Just Inès starring Daniel Weyman and the French actress Caroline Ducey was premiered at the Mannheim-Heidelberg International Film Festival (2010) and was subsequently screened at the Cairo International Film Festival and FEST Belgrade, Serbia. Open My Eyes, starring Oliver Tobias and Alissa Jung, was first screened in 2016. Grant also directed the short Electric Cinema's How To Behave, starring Benedict Cumberbatch, Natalie Dormer, Michael McIntyre, Nigella Lawson, James Corden, Rafe Spall, Emilia Fox, amongst others.

References

External links 

 www.mamafilmworx.com
 www.wonderousstoriesff.com

1961 births
British film directors
British film producers
British male screenwriters
Living people
People educated at Reed's School
Writers from London
New York Film Academy alumni